Timothy John Rogerson Wood (born 13 August 1940), known as Tim Wood, is a British politician. He was the Conservative Party Member of Parliament (MP) for Stevenage, which he won at the 1983 general election.

While in Parliament, Wood served as a Parliamentary Private Secretary to Ministers in the Ministry of Defence and Northern Ireland Office.  Following the 1992 general election, Wood became a Government Whip.

At the 1997 general election a swing of 13.9% from the Conservatives to Labour saw Wood defeated by Labour Party candidate Barbara Follett by 11,582 votes.

On 3 May 2007, Wood was elected to East Devon District Council to represent Exmouth Littleham ward.

References

External links 
 

1940 births
Living people
Conservative Party (UK) MPs for English constituencies
Members of the Bow Group
UK MPs 1983–1987
UK MPs 1987–1992
UK MPs 1992–1997
Councillors in Devon